The October 2017 Iberian wildfires were a series of more than 7,900 forest fires affecting Northern Portugal and Northwestern Spain between 13 and 18 October. The wildfires claimed the lives of at least 49 individuals, including 45 in Portugal and four in Spain, and dozens more were injured.

The first fires started on or before 13 October in Galicia. The Prime Minister of Spain Mariano Rajoy and Jorge Gomes, Portugal's secretary of state of internal administration, believed most of the fires were lit by arsonists. By 15 October 2017 winds increased, due in part to Hurricane Ophelia passing between the Azores and the peninsula, which helped fan wildfires in both Portugal and Spain.

In Portugal, on its worst day, firefighters battled over 440 fires. The country sought assistance from European neighbours and Morocco.  The Portuguese Minister of Internal Administration Constança Urbano de Sousa, who resigned as a consequence, said "We have all our firefighters out there doing everything they can".

Four months earlier, the June 2017 Portugal wildfires had caused 66 deaths in Portugal, for a total of 115 deaths (111 in Portugal, 4 in Spain) between the two incidents.

Meteorological aftermath in Europe
The arrival of Ophelia brought Saharan dust to parts of the United Kingdom, giving the sky an orange or yellow-sepia appearance, and the sun a red or orange appearance. A strange 'burning' smell was also reported across Devon, also attributed to the dust, and smoke from forest fires in Portugal and Spain. Approximately 50,000 households lost power in Northern Ireland. Insurance claims from Northern Ireland, Wales, and Scotland are estimated to reach £5–10 million (US$6.6–13.2 million).

In Tallinn, Estonia, a black rain occurred due to the fact that Ophelia brought smoke and soot of fires to Estonia from Portugal, as well as dust from the Sahara Desert, Report informs citing the Estonian media. "We looked at photos from satellites and the Finnish weather service confirmed that the smoke and soot of the fires in Portugal and partly the dust from the Sahara reached us," meteorologist Taimi Paljak said.

See also

 June 2017 Portugal wildfires
 Hurricane Ophelia (2017)
 2017 wildfire season

References

2017 in Portugal
2017 wildfires
Air pollution in Spain
Arson in Portugal
Arson in Spain
October 2017 events in Europe
October 2017 events in Spain
Wildfires in Portugal
Wildfires in Spain
History of the Iberian Peninsula
2017 crimes in Portugal
2017 wildfires in Spain